Bernina-Val-Roseg-Schanze was a K75 ski jumping hill located in Val Roseg valley at Pontresina, Switzerland, opened in 1925.

History
On 21 January 1928, Swiss Adolf Badrutt fell at 73.5 meters (241 ft) world record distance. 

On 2 January 1930, Swiss Adolf Badrutt fell at 74.5 meters (244 ft) world record distance.

On 12 January 1930, Swiss Adolf Badrutt jumped 75 meters (246 ft) and set the only official world record on this hill.

Ski jumping world records

 Not recognized! Fall at world record distance.

References

External links
Bernina-Val-Roseg-Schanze at skisprungschanzen.com

Ski jumping venues in Switzerland